Dudher Kuthi Dewan Bosh is a village under Suktabari Gram panchayat in the Cooch Behar I division of Cooch Behar Sadar subdivision of Cooch Behar district in West Bengal, India.

Education
 Suktabari Ekramia High Madrasah
 Suktabari State High Madrasah
 Kaliganj High School

See also
 Suktabari

References

Villages in Cooch Behar district